The 1994 season is the 6th year in Foshan Football Club's existence, their first season in the professional football league.

Coaching staff

Squad

Training matches and friendlies

Competitions

Chinese Jia-B League

Table

Results by round

Results summary

League Matches

References

Foshan